Diederik Wissels (born December 1960, in Rotterdam, Netherlands) is a Dutch jazz pianist.

In 1968, he moved to Brussels, Belgium and later attended Boston's Berklee College of Music. In his early career, he played with Chet Baker, Joe Henderson and Toots Thielemans. Wissels' solo and duo recordings include "The Hillock Songstress" (1994), "From This Day Forward" (1997), "Streams" with Bart Defoort (2001), "Song of You" (2004), "Pasarela" (2017) and "Secrecy" (2020 - with Portuguese singer Ana Rocha). He appears regularly and has also recorded with David Linx, for example on Viktor Lazlo's album Amour(s).

References

External links 
Official website
Biography
Diederik Wissels on Igloo Records

1960 births
Living people
Dutch jazz pianists
Musicians from Rotterdam
21st-century pianists
Alumni of the European Schools
Label Bleu artists
Timeless Records artists
Igloo Records artists